In politics, a lame duck or outgoing politician is an elected official whose successor has already been elected or will be soon. An outgoing politician is often seen as having less influence with other politicians due to their limited time left in office. Conversely, a lame duck is free to make decisions that exercise the standard powers with little fear of consequence, such as issuing executive orders, pardons, or other controversial edicts. Lame duck politicians result from term limits, planned retirement, or electoral losses, and are especially noticeable where political systems build in a delay between the announcement of results and the taking of office by election winners. Even at the local level, politicians who do not seek re-election can lose credibility and influence. Uncompleted projects may fall to the wayside as their influence diminishes.

Description
The status can be due to:
having lost a re-election bid
choosing not to seek another term, which would start at the expiration of the current term
a term limit which prevents the official from running for that particular office again
the abolition of the office, which must nonetheless be served out until the end of the official's term.

Lame duck officials tend to have less political power, as other elected officials are less inclined to cooperate with them. One example was the  day–long presidential transition period (November 8, 1932, to March 4, 1933) at the end of Herbert Hoover's presidency, prior to the start of the Franklin D. Roosevelt administration. After the election, Roosevelt refused Hoover's requests for a meeting to come up with a joint program to stop the crisis and calm investors, claiming it would limit his options, and as this "guaranteed that Roosevelt took the oath of office amid such an atmosphere of crisis that Hoover had become the most hated man in America". During this time, the U.S. economy suffered as thousands of banks failed.
 
However, lame ducks are also in the peculiar position of not facing the consequences of their actions in a subsequent election, giving them greater freedom to issue unpopular decisions or appointments. Examples include last-minute midnight regulations issued by executive agencies of outgoing US presidential administrations and executive orders issued by outgoing presidents. Such actions date back to the Judiciary Act of 1801 ("Midnight Judges Act"), in which Federalist President John Adams and the outgoing 6th Congress amended the Judiciary Act to create more federal judge seats for Adams to appoint and the Senate to confirm before the Democratic-Republican Thomas Jefferson was inaugurated and the Democratic-Republican majority 7th Congress convened.

In more recent history, US President Bill Clinton was widely criticized for issuing 140 pardons and other acts of executive clemency on his last day in office, including two former close colleagues, donors, fellow Democratic members, and his own half-brother.

In many countries, toward the facilitation of a smooth transition, an outgoing president accepts advice from and consults with the president-elect.

Origins of the term
The phrase "lame duck" was coined in the 18th century at the London Stock Exchange, to refer to a stockbroker who defaulted on his debts.

The first known mention of the term in writing was made by Horace Walpole, from a letter in 1761 to Sir Horace Mann: "Do you know what a Bull and a Bear and Lame Duck are?"

In 1791, Mary Berry wrote of the Duchess of Devonshire's loss of £50,000 in stocks, "the conversation of the town" that her name was to be "posted up as a lame duck".

In the literal sense, the term refers to a duck which is unable to keep up with its flock, making it a target for predators.

The term was transferred to politicians in the 19th century. The first known recorded use is in the Congressional Globe (then the official record of the United States Congress) of January 14, 1863: "In no event ... could [the Court of Claims] be justly obnoxious to the charge of being a receptacle of 'lame ducks' or broken down politicians."

Examples

Australia
In Australia, regardless of when the election is held, the Senate (upper house) sits from July 1 following the election to June 30 six years later, while the newly elected members of the House of Representatives (lower house) take their seats soon after an election. A Senate that is destined to lose its majority as a result of such a change is called a lame-duck Senate and often attracts criticism if it blocks government measures introduced in the House of Representatives.

For example, after the 2004 election, it became clear that the governing Liberal Party/National Party coalition would gain a majority in the new Senate, which was due to sit the following July. In May, some months after the elections but before the new Senate came to power, the old Senate refused to pass new tax laws that had been passed by the House, which served to merely delay the passage of those laws until the new Senate assembled.

In the 2010 Australian federal election, Senator Steve Fielding of the minor party Family First lost his seat and subsequently threatened to block supply if the Labor Party was successful in forming a minority government.

Canada
Unlike the United States Congress, there is no "lame duck" session of Parliament in most Commonwealth countries between the general election and swearing in of elected officials. In almost all cases, the outgoing prime minister or premier hands over power directly to their designated successor after a leadership contest or general election. Usually, when the leader of a ruling party steps down, they also relinquish their caucus leadership role at around the same time, so there is no need for an interim caucus leader. After an election retiring/defeated members of United States Congress do continue to wield their full authority until their term ends, by contrast the power of outgoing Canadian parliamentarians is limited. Instead the departing prime minister or premier and cabinet ministers that were members of the now dissolved parliament will serve in an "acting" or "caretaker" capacity (i.e. not being able to make important appointments nor policy declarations) until the new parliament convenes; in one example when Sir Charles Tupper attempted to make appointments after losing the 1896 Canadian election the Governor General refused to act on this.

A notable exception to the above is the transition between William Lyon Mackenzie King and Louis St. Laurent, making it perhaps the only lame duck example in Canadian federal politics. After resigning the leadership of the Liberals, King became parliamentary leader and continued as Prime Minister of Canada for some months following the leadership election of his successor, St. Laurent, who became party leader but continued as a member of King's cabinet during this time.

While Pierre Trudeau retired from politics in 1984, he directly handed power over to John Turner after the leadership contest. However, Trudeau recommended that Governor General Jeanne Sauvé appoint over 200 Liberals to well-paying patronage positions, including Senators, judges, and executives on various governmental and crown corporation boards, widely seen as a way to offer "plum jobs" to loyal party members. These appointments generated a severe backlash across the spectrum. Turner had the right to recommend that the appointments be cancelled: advice that Sauvé would have been required to follow by constitutional convention. However, he let them stand and made a further 70 appointments himself. Turner refused to produce a written agreement he had made with Trudeau before taking office, documenting a secret deal that saw Trudeau step down early. This is seen by many as Trudeau attempting to exercise some lame duck influence before resigning as Prime Minister.

New Zealand

In 1984, a constitutional crisis arose when the outgoing "lame duck" Prime Minister Robert Muldoon refused to follow the wishes of a new incoming government led by David Lange. This was the only time in New Zealand where a "lame duck" Prime Minister did not follow the wishes of the incoming government.

United Kingdom
Like many parliamentary systems, but unlike countries such as the United States that build in a transition period between elections and the taking of office by their winners, the UK does not have lame ducks in the sense of politicians holding office for a substantial delay after a successor has been elected.

Following general elections where a party wins a clear majority in the House of Commons, the identity of the new prime minister is immediately apparent and they are usually appointed the following morning, minutes after their predecessor resigns the office, at back-to-back meetings with the monarch. In the case of a hung parliament where the election is followed by negotiations to form a coalition, or an attempt by the leader of the largest party to lead a minority government, a new prime minister may not be appointed for a few days. In the 2010 election for example, which was held on May 6, Gordon Brown's Labour Party lost its majority in the Commons, but Brown remained caretaker prime minister until May 11, resigning when it became clear that the Conservative Party (which held a plurality) had reached a coalition agreement with the Liberal Democrats, whereupon the Conservative leader David Cameron was appointed prime minister.

Members of parliament cease to be such when parliament is dissolved for a general election, and cannot describe themselves as "John Smith MP" during the election campaign. Government ministers however, as part of the executive, continue to hold office unless and until new ministers are appointed after the election.

An example of a lame-duck period in the informal sense is the last two years of the premiership of Tony Blair, who before the 2005 United Kingdom general election announced that he would not serve another full term before standing down. However, the fact that Blair's Labour Party was returned with a substantially reduced majority and that Gordon Brown (who was correctly believed to be Blair's successor) had played a leading part in the election campaign, aroused considerable speculation about Blair's future as party leader and prime minister.

United States

In U.S. politics, the period between (presidential and congressional) elections in November and the inauguration of officials early in the following year is commonly called the "lame duck period". A president is a lame duck after a successor has been elected, during which time the outgoing president and president-elect usually embark on a transition of power.

Until 1933, inaugurations occurred on March 4. Congress usually had two sessions, the second of which was usually held from the December after the election of the next Congress until March. This session was commonly called the "lame duck session". Criticism of this process led to the passage of the 20th Amendment in 1933, which moved the beginning of the new Congress to January 3 and the inauguration of the president to January 20, thus shortening the lame duck period.

A president elected to a second term is sometimes seen as a lame duck from early in the second term, since term limits prevent them from contesting re-election four years later. However, not personally having to face the electorate again makes a second-term president more powerful than they were in their first term as they are thus freer to take politically unpopular actions. However, this comes with caveats; as the de facto leader of their political party, the president's actions affect how the party performs in the midterm elections two years into the second term, and, to some extent, the success of that party's nominee in the next presidential election four years in the future. For these reasons, it can be argued that a president in their second term is not a lame duck at all.

In his farewell speech from the office of president in January 2017, Barack Obama jokingly quipped, "You can tell that I'm a lame duck because nobody's following instructions" when the cheering and applause from the crowd prevented him from commencing his speech.

Vatican City
On February 11, 2013, when Pope Benedict XVI announced that he was resigning within 17 days, he was called a lame duck pope by some media outlets. Also, due to Pope John Paul II's long and debilitating illness, some journalists (such as Times Jeff Israely) described the final years of his reign as a lame duck papacy.

Venezuela 
The discontent with the ruling United Socialist Party of Venezuela saw the opposition being elected to hold the majority in the National Assembly of Venezuela for the first time since 1999 following the 2015 parliamentary election. As a result of that election, the lame-duck National Assembly consisting of United Socialist officials filled the Supreme Tribunal (supreme court) with allies. Into early 2016, the Supreme Tribunal alleged that voting irregularities occurred in the parliamentary elections and stripped four Assembly members of their seats, preventing an opposition supermajority in the National Assembly which would be able to challenge President Maduro. The Assembly nevertheless swore in the members in question, in response to which the Supreme Court ruled that the Assembly was in contempt of court and in violation of the constitutional order. The Supreme Tribunal then began to approve multiple actions performed by Maduro and granted him more powers and later stripped the National Assembly of legislative powers, and took those powers for itself; which meant that the Supreme Tribunal might have been able to create laws, causing the 2017 constitutional crisis.

Other

Sports
In sports usage, a coach or general manager in the final year of their contract without a forthcoming contract extension is often described as a lame duck.

However, if a team is on track to miss the playoffs, a coach or general manager can be regarded as a lame duck even if they are under multiyear contracts, if they are expected to be fired shortly before or once the season ends. Often taking the blame as the team is out of contention for the postseason, the coach or/and general manager is seen as a poor fit or otherwise does not relate well with others – players and other coaches, the media, their superiors and so forth – and a change in leadership is apparently forthcoming or desired. Often, there will be rumors of a coach and/or manager departure – often by dismissal or forced resignation (also known as "by mutual consent") – with said rumors often beginning several games before the end of the season. Dismissal of the coach and/or manager once the team is eliminated from reaching the postseason, rather than waiting for the conclusion of the season, does cut short their "lame duck" status and clears the way for new hires. In that case, an interim coach and/or interim manager will be appointed to see out the remainder of the season, though their predecessors may still remain on the club payroll as a "special advisor" until their contracts expires.

Business
Especially in the United Kingdom, a "lame duck company" is one that is in such financial difficulty that it is not worth investing in, or is unworthy of government support.

Software engineering
In networked server systems, term "lame duck mode" is used to describe a networked server that is being in process of shutting down (for example for software update or relocating to a different physical machine). During lame duck mode, which can last from few seconds to few minutes, server will finish serving existing clients and requests, and for some time will continue accepting new requests, while notifying clients to not contact them again for some time. If server continues receiving new requests after this grace period, it might stop serving them and shut down anyway, depending on a desired outcome and configuration. With proper cooperation of client applications, this reduces service disruption and retry latency in distributed systems. There are many other possible variations of "lame duck mode", like serving existing connections, but not accepting any new connections. As such lame duck mode is part of general load balancing methods.

See also
Caretaker government
Provisional government
Roi fainéant

References

Political metaphors referring to people
Elections terminology